North Poso Kota is a district in Indonesia. It is located in the Poso Regency of Central Sulawesi. Along with the neighboring districts of Poso Kota and South Poso Kota, this district makes up the capital region of Poso Regency, Poso, covering 56.57 km2 with a population of 47,477 in 2020.

With the population of 12,930 inhabitants and a population density of 639 per km2, North Poso Kota is the 8th most populous and 2nd most densely populated district in Poso Regency. With an area of 20.22 per km2, North Poso Kota is one of the smallest districts, with only 0.28% of the total area of Poso Regency.

Administrative division 
As of 2020, North Poso Kota District consists of 7 administrative villages, namely:
 Bonesompe
 Kasintuwu
 Lawanga
 Lawanga Tawongan
 Lombogia
 Madale
 Tegal Rejo

References

Further reading

Districts of Central Sulawesi